Letters is the second full-length album by Butch Walker, released on August 24, 2004 on Epic Records. It featured an enhanced CD portion with the music videos to "Mixtape" and "Don't Move".

Track listing
All songs written by Butch Walker, except where noted.
"Sunny Day Real Estate" – 0:28
"Maybe It's Just Me" – 3:20
"Mixtape" – 4:05
"#1 Summer Jam" – 3:28
"So at Last" (Danny Grady, Walker) – 5:28
"Uncomfortably Numb" – 3:33
"Joan" – 4:20
"Don't Move" – 4:08
"Lights Out" – 2:51
"Best Thing You Never Had" – 5:29
"Race Cars and Goth Rock" – 3:02
"Promise" – 3:04
"Thank-You Note" – 7:48
There is an acoustic hidden track titled "State Line" at the end of "Thank-You Note"

Bonus tracks
The Japanese release of the album contained the bonus tracks "Last Flight Out" and "My Best Friend's Magic Girlfriend", from Walker's previous Heartwork EP (2004).

Personnel
Fran Capitinelli – electric guitar, B-Bender
Kenny Cresswell – drums
Dan Dixon – lapsteel
Jim Ebert – synthesizer, backing vocals, percussion, Hammond organ, moog, organ
Danny Grady – electric guitar, bass, backing vocals
JT Hall – bass
Joey Huffman – Wurlitzer, Hammond organ, organ, piano, Mellotron
Sean Loughlin – turntables
Rick Richards – electric guitar, slide guitar
Morgan Rose – drums
Joe Stark – electric guitar
Mickey Wade – whistle, congas
Butch Walker – vocals, backing vocals, acoustic guitar, electric guitar, bass, percussion, slide guitar, vibes, piano, timpani
Bobby Yang – strings, violin

2004 albums
Butch Walker albums
Albums produced by Butch Walker
Epic Records albums